Harpalobrachys leiroides is a species of beetle in the family Carabidae, the only species in the genus Harpalobrachys.

References

Harpalinae